Fredenburg Butte is a summit in the U.S. state of Oregon.

Fredenburg Butte was named in the 1870s after one Francis M. Fredenburg.

References

Buttes of Oregon
Mountains of Jackson County, Oregon
Mountains of Oregon